Cyme or CYME may refer to:

Ancient Greek cities 
 Cyme (Euboea), modern Kymi
 Cyme (Aeolis) in Asia Minor
 Cyme (Italy), near Naples

Other uses 
 Cyme (botany), an arrangement of flowers in a plant inflorescence
 Cyme (moth), a genus of moth
 Matane/Russell-Burnett Airport, in Quebec, Canada